Gareth Greenall, better known by his stage name Audio, is a British DJ and producer from Redhill, UK. Currently signed to RAM Records and his own label Snake Pit Records, he has released three albums on Virus Recordings. Greenall is also part of the record production group Pixel Fist.

Biography 

Attending the "Dance Kiss FM" events in London as a teenager, Audio became familiar with the jungle and Drum and bass scene and soon booked his own party with DJs Ed Rush & Optical. He was hired as studio engineer at the UK hard house label "Alphamagic" and later became an A&R. In 2002, he founded "Resonant Evil" along with Colin Worth and Jason Bull, for which he released several records until 2005. His debut album To the Edge Of Reason, released in 2008 on Tech Freak Recordings, received praises throughout the scene and also caught the attention of Virus Recordings executives Ed Rush & Optical (DJ) where he subsequently was signed to. His follow-up albums Genesis Device and Soul Magnet saw further  successful singles such as "Vacuum" and "Headroom". In 2013, his final album with Virus Recordings came out after his successful "Sabretooth" remix by Optiv & BTK.

In 2014, Audio signed with RAM Records and had his first release shortly thereafter, "Heads Up" / "Stampede".

In 2019, Audio founded his own label Snake Pit Records. Shortly after, he released the first single on the new label titled "Frog March".

Discography

Albums

Singles

References

External links 

 Audio on bandcamp.com
 Audio on ramrecords.com
 
 
 

English DJs
English record producers
English drum and bass musicians
Living people
Electronic dance music DJs
Year of birth missing (living people)
RAM Records artists
People from Redhill, Surrey
Musicians from Surrey